Caenurgina is a genus of moths in the family Erebidae.

Species
 Caenurgina annexa (Edwards, 1890) – banded grass moth
 Caenurgina caerulea (Grote, 1873) – cerulean looper moth
 Caenurgina crassiuscula (Haworth, 1809) – clover looper, range grass moth
 Caenurgina erechtea (Cramer, 1780) – forage looper, common grass moth

Former species
 Caenurgina distincta (Neumoegen, 1883)

References

External links

 
Euclidiini
Moth genera
Taxa named by James Halliday McDunnough